North Carolina Highway 194 (NC 194) is a primary state highway in the U.S. state of North Carolina. Entirely in the High Country, it runs from US 19E, in Ingalls, to the Virginia state line, near Helton.

Route description
The nature of NC 194 is one of a route that primarily serves local traffic. NC 194 may be thought of as a collection of individual routings under one number, as each segment serves its own local traffic and local needs—it is quicker to use other routes to get to another segment of NC 194 than to use NC 194 itself. It does not take the most direct route possible due to its endpoints and destinations, but instead meanders through the mountains, serving predominantly rural communities in the High Country to provide access to outside communities. Because of this, it is not a route that is typically traveled for its entire length, or any significant part of its length.

Ingalls to Elk Park 
NC 194 begins heading due east in the community of Ingalls, on a moderately curvy stretch of road known as Three Mile Highway, eventually meeting its first of many junctions with US 221. On its first of three concurrences with US 221, the routes go through the town of Crossnore, then separate after leaving the area. NC 194 then heads north towards Elk Park, passing through Newland—this is a relatively straight stretch of road. A passing lane; one of few on NC 194 due to its mountainous nature, is available for southbound travelers between Newland and Elk Park.

Elk Park to Vilas 
Between Elk Park and Vilas, the route becomes much more curvy, hugging the banks of several local waterways—The Elk River, between Elk Park and Banner Elk, the Craborchard Creek from the Watauga–Avery County line to Valle Crucis, and the Watauga River in Valle Crucis. In Banner Elk, drivers are met with numerous pedestrian crossings. The road provides access to the Elk River Airport, Lees–McRae College, and provides access via NC 184 to the ski resorts on Beech and Sugar Mountain.

Vilas to West Jefferson 
From Vilas through Boone, it is triplexed with US 421 and US 321, passing through Downtown Boone. US 321 exits this triplex, leaving on Blowing Rock Road. It becomes a duplex with US 421 until NC 105, where it becomes briefly triplexed with US 221 as once more, between NC 105 and Jefferson Road. Here, it exits the concurrencies. Heading north, it travels through the unincorporated community of Sands, and provides access to Meat Camp. After passing through Sands, the route becomes narrow and curvy again, serving the community of Todd as a North Carolina Scenic Byway.

Reconnecting with US 221 in Baldwin, the road widens, and is briefly a divided highway. In West Jefferson, the road splits from US 221 for the final time. NC 194 goes through downtown West Jefferson, concurrent with US 221 Business before the latter route splits at West Second Street.

West Jefferson to the Virginia state line 
From West Jefferson, NC 194 continues heading north, duplexing with NC 88, starting in Smethport and continuing until Warrensville. NC 194 from this point will not meet another route for its last  to the Virginia state line. On its trek there, it passes through several unincorporated communities: Bina, Lansing, Brandon, Sturgills, and Helton. Reaching the Virginia line, it becomes a narrow, unmarked secondary road, numbered as SR 743 and named Rugby Road, which eventually connects to US 58.

The highway is the northernmost primary route in the state.

Scenic byways
NC 194 is part of two scenic byway in the state (indicated by a Scenic Byways sign).  Both routes are not recommended for recreational vehicles or buses.

Mission Crossing Byway is an  byway from Elk Park to Vilas, passing through the town of Banner Elk and the communities of Heaton, Balm, and Valle Crucis.  The route gets its name from the 1895 mission built in Valle Crucis by the Episcopal Church, today it is used as a camp and conference center.  The route is also noted for its back-road feel, a farm built in 1812, and the Mast General Store. The Valle Crucis, Shawneehaw and Elk Park Turnpike was built as a toll road between 1891 and 1892, by hand labor and without machinery. A particular four mile section is noted for its curves from the Valle Crucis Elementary School to Banner Elk, and for its scenic beauty. Today, the roadbed is part of North Carolina Highway 194.

New River Valley Byway is an  byway, split in two sections.  The first section is traversed by NC 194 from Boone to Baldwin, passing through the community of Todd.  The section is noted for its Christmas tree farms, the North Fork New River, a site of a Revolutionary War engagement, and the Todd General Store.  The second section is on NC 88, between Jefferson and Laurel Springs.

History

NC 194 is an original state highway that traveled between NC 19, in Woodlawn, and NC 69, in Minneapolis; connecting Altamont and Newland along its routing.  In 1923, NC 194 was rerouted north from Newland to NC 69, in Cranberry; its old alignment, which paralleled the ETWN "Tweetsie" Railroad, became Old Toe River Road (SR 1157).  In 1924, NC 194 was extended to the Tennessee state line, replacing NC 694.  In 1930, NC 194 replaced NC 69 north of Elk Park to US 321/NC 60, in Vilas; its former routing to Tennessee became part of NC 69.

In 1932, NC 194 was replaced by US 221/NC 28, between Woodlawn and Crossnore.  The following year, NC 194 was re-extended south along US 221/NC 28, through Crossnore and Altamont, then replaced NC 691 to its current southern terminus in Ingalls.

Around 1953, NC 194 was extended from Vilas, along US 421 through Boone, then north replacing an old alignment of US 221 through Todd to Baldwin.  Overlapping with US 221 to West Jefferson, it then replaces NC 162 through Warrensville to its current northern terminus at the Virginia state line.

Between 1963 and 1968, NC 194 was realigned onto new road between Newland and Elk Park, leaving behind Blevins Creek Road (SR 1361).  In 1981, US 221/NC 194 was placed on road between Baldwin and West Jefferson, leaving behind Beaver Creek School Road (SR 1248).

North Carolina Highway 691

North Carolina Highway 691 (NC 691) was established in 1925 as a new primary routing between NC 69, in Ingalls, to NC 194, near Linville Falls.  In 1926, NC 691 was truncated further north from Linville Falls, at the east end of Three Mile Highway; the old alignment replaced by NC 194.  In 1930, NC 691 was extended north, with a concurrency with US 221, to Twin Oaks; its new alignment replaced part of NC 194 to Crossnore, NC 181 to Pineola, NC 176 to Linville, NC 175 to Blowing Rock and NC 69 between Boone to Twin Oaks.  In 1932, NC 691 was reverted to its pre-1930 alignment, with NC 28 replacing it with its former concurrency with US 221.  In 1933, NC 691 was decommission with the extension of NC 194 to Ingalls.

Junction list

Special routes

Banner Elk–Valle Crucis truck route

North Carolina Highway 194 Truck (NC 194 Truck) redirects truckers traveling through either Banner Elk or Valle Crucis to not use the mainline highway between the two locations, with explicate flashing warning signs.  This  detour takes truckers, from Banner Elk, south along NC 184 to Tynecastle (a.k.a. Invershield or Linville Gap), then north along NC 105 to Broadstone Road (SR-1112); hugging the Watauga River, it eventually reconnects with mainline NC 194 in Valle Crucis.

References

External links

 NCRoads.com: N.C. 194
 NCRoads.com: N.C. 691

194
Transportation in Avery County, North Carolina
Transportation in Watauga County, North Carolina
Transportation in Ashe County, North Carolina